Mamadapur  is a village in the southern state of Karnataka, India. It is located in the Gokak taluk of Belagavi district in Karnataka.
It is the birthplace of Wrangler D.C. Pavate

Demographics
 India census, Mamadapur had a population of 7,636 with 3,933 males and 3,703 females.
Mamadapur village is located 15 km from Gokak city.

See also
 Belgaum
 Districts of Karnataka

References

External links
 http://Belgaum.nic.in/

Villages in Belagavi district